Bassem Hassan Mohammed (born 31 May 1987) is a Qatari equestrian. He competed in the individual jumping competition at the 2016 Summer Olympics.
Bassem Hassan Mohammed was positive in a doping test done during a Csio competition in Rabat in October 2019.

References

External links
 

1987 births
Living people
Place of birth missing (living people)
Qatari male equestrians
Show jumping riders
Equestrians at the 2016 Summer Olympics
Olympic equestrians of Qatar
Equestrians at the 2014 Asian Games
Equestrians at the 2018 Asian Games
Asian Games gold medalists for Qatar
Asian Games bronze medalists for Qatar
Asian Games medalists in equestrian
Medalists at the 2014 Asian Games
Medalists at the 2018 Asian Games